Nan Rendong (19 February 1945–15 September 2017) was a Chinese astronomer of Manchu descent.

Nan Rendong was a researcher at National Astronomical Observatory of China, and he was the founder, Chief Scientist and the Chief Engineer of the Five hundred meter Aperture Spherical Telescope (FAST) in China. He was an IAU member, where he was the Vice-President of Division X (Radio Astronomy) and Commission 40 (Radio Astronomy) from 2003 to 2006, and then the President of both the division and commission in 2006–2009.

Nan Rendong died from lung cancer in Boston on 15 September 2017. He was 72 years old. Asteroid 79694 Nanrendong was named in his memory. The official  was published by the Minor Planet Center on 25 September 2018.

References

External links 
 , includes an interview with Nan Rendong

1945 births
2017 deaths
21st-century Chinese astronomers
Tsinghua University alumni
Radio astronomers
Manchu people
People from Liaoyuan
Deaths from lung cancer
Physicists from Jilin
20th-century Chinese astronomers